Land of Fire may refer to:
 The Land of Fire, Azerbaijan's national motto
 Land of Fire (triptych), a monumental triptych by the Azerbaijani painter Tahir Salakhov
 The archipelago of Tierra del Fuego, sometimes translated as "Land of Fire" or "Fireland"
 Isla Grande de Tierra del Fuego, the archipelago's main island
 Land of Fire, a nation in the fictional universe of Naruto

See also 

 Tierra del Fuego (disambiguation)
 Firelands